Ashburnham was an electoral district of the Legislative Assembly in the Australian state of New South Wales, originally created in 1894 in the Parkes area and named after Ashburnham County. In 1920, with the introduction of proportional representation, it was absorbed into Murrumbidgee, along with Lachlan. It was recreated in 1927 and abolished in 1950.

Members for Ashburnham

See also
 Electoral results for the district of Ashburnham

References

Former electoral districts of New South Wales
1894 establishments in Australia
Constituencies established in 1894
1920 disestablishments in Australia
Constituencies disestablished in 1920
1927 establishments in Australia
Constituencies established in 1927
1950 disestablishments in Australia
Constituencies disestablished in 1950